II-VI Marlow is a division of II-VI Incorporated. Based in Dallas, Texas, II-VI Marlow designs and manufactures thermoelectric modules and systems.

History
Marlow Industries Incorporated was founded by Raymond Marlow in 1973, and focused on thermoelectric cooling technology for the defense sector.

In 1991, Marlow Industries Incorporated received the Malcolm Baldrige National Quality Award, an award created by the U.S. Congress and presented by the President. Marlow Industries was recognized for its work in improving the company through deployment of a Total Quality Management system.

In 2004, the company was acquired by II-VI Incorporated. Marlow Industries Incorporated became a subsidiary of the company and began operating within II-VI’s Compound Semiconductors Group.

The company opened its first offshore manufacturing facility in Ho Chi Minh City, Vietnam, in 2005. When the factory opened, it focused on thermoelectric module assembly lines for standard commercial products. It now includes various component and system assembly lines and an engineering design center.

In 2007, Marlow Industries Incorporated announced an equity stake in Fuxin Electronics, a company based in Guangdong Province, China, in order to allow both companies to expand opportunities in the thermoelectric industry.

In 2014, Marlow Industries Incorporated became a division of II-VI Incorporated, and is now known as II-VI Marlow.

Technology

II-VI Marlow designs and manufactures semiconductor-based thermoelectric coolers and subsystems, which provide cooling, heating, temperature stabilization, power generation, and energy harvesting functions. Its products are used for infrared sensors, fibre-optic guidance systems, thermal reference sources, refrigerators, and chillers.

II-VI Marlow thermoelectric materials and devices have been used by the Defense Advanced Research Projects Agency (DARPA) to enable the Department of Defense (DOD) thermal management systems to operate at lower temperatures with higher performance and longer lifetime.

References

Electronics companies of the United States
Manufacturing companies based in Dallas
Electronics companies established in 1973
1973 establishments in Texas